Roll on Texas Moon  is a 1946 American Western film directed by William Witney and starring Roy Rogers.

Cast
 Roy Rogers as Himself
 Trigger as Roy's Horse (The Smartest Horse in the Movies)
 George 'Gabby' Hayes as Gabby Whittaker
 Dale Evans as Jill Delaney
 Dennis Hoey as Cole Gregory
 Elisabeth Risdon as Cactus Kate Taylor
 Francis McDonald as Steve Anders
 Edward Keane as Frank B. Wilson
 Tom London as Sheriff Bert Morris
 Harry Strong as Don Williams
 Ed Cassidy as Tom Prescott
 Lee Shumway as Ned Barnes
 Steve Darrell as Joe Cunnings
 Pierce Lyden as Henchman Stuhles

References

External links
 

1946 films
Republic Pictures films
1946 Western (genre) films
American Western (genre) films
American black-and-white films
Films directed by William Witney
1940s English-language films
1940s American films